Richard Akinwande Savage (1874–1935) was a prominent physician, journalist and politician in Lagos, Nigeria during the colonial era.

Early years
Richard Akinwande Savage was born in 1874, the son of a successful merchant in Lagos descended from Egba and Sierra Leone Creole families.
He attended the University of Edinburgh where he studied medicine, served as an officer in the Afro-West Indian Society, edited the 1899–1900 Hand Book and was sub-editor of The Student. 
He attended the Pan-African conference in London in July 1900. He was the last African to be appointed to the colonial medical service, as an Assistant Colonial Surgeon, before the 1902 declaration by Joseph Chamberlain that in future the service would be restricted to Europeans. Savage worked for several years in Cape Coast in the Gold Coast (modern Ghana) as a government physician and as a private practitioner.

Political activity
Savage was one of the leading members of the People's Union founded in 1908 by John K. Randle (1855–1928).
Others were Orisadipe Obasa (1863–1940), Kitoye Ajasa (1866–1937)) and Adeyemo Alakija (1884–1952). Although the People's Union was controlled by men with conservative views, it attracted some professionals with progressive ideas such as Ernest Ikoli (1893–1960), journalist and founder of the Nigerian Youth Movement.
The People's Union, which was in favor of gradual introduction of reforms, opposed the more radical and nationalist Nigerian National Democratic Party (NNDP) founded in 1922 by Herbert Macaulay.
The People's Union dissolved in 1928 after Randle died.

Around 1914 Savage was among those who proposed the National Council of British West Africa (NCBWA).
The NCBWA consisted of elites from across West Africa.
The NCBWA emerged as a broad-based party in 1919 and held its first congress in Ghana in 1920.
Among its demands were the establishment of a university, appointment of Africans to senior civil service positions and greater African participation in the Legislative Councils of the British West African colonies.

Savage was a regular contributor to the Gold Coast Leader.
He returned to Lagos around 1915 where he began to practice medicine privately, and continued to contribute to local newspapers. He later founded the Nigerian Spectator (1923–30) and the Akibooni Press. 
He set up the Lagos Committee of the NCBWA. 
After he failed to be nominated Egbaland representative on the Legislative Council he broke up the NCBWA Lagos Committee. Around 1920 he was a founding member and secretary of the Egba Society.

Private life
Richard Akiwande Savage married Maggie Bowie, a Scottish woman in 1899 and had two children who followed his footsteps in the field of medicine: Major Richard Gabriel Akinwande Savage and Dr. Agnes Yewande Savage.

Death
Richard Akinwande Savage died in 1935.

References

Sources

1874 births
1935 deaths
Nigerian journalists
Yoruba physicians
Politicians from Lagos
Yoruba politicians
19th-century Nigerian people
20th-century Nigerian politicians
Yoruba journalists
Alumni of the University of Edinburgh
People from colonial Nigeria
History of Lagos
Nigerian people of Sierra Leonean descent
19th-century Nigerian medical doctors
20th-century Nigerian medical doctors
Physicians from Lagos
Saro people
Richard Akinwande
Sierra Leone Creole people
Expatriates from Lagos Colony in the United Kingdom